DOORS OPEN Pittsburgh is a 501(c)3 nonprofit based in Pittsburgh, Pennsylvania that presents historical and architectural tours that go behind-the-scenes inside iconic buildings and new spaces.  The tours encourage everyone to #Be Nebby and include an annual event; neighborhood, guided walking, bus and specialty tours; and virtual storytelling.

Mission Statement 
DOORS OPEN Pittsburgh encourages the appreciation of Pittsburgh’s architectural design, history and art through a series of immersive events that educate the general public by sharing the quintessential stories of the City’s past, present and future.  This also gives tour goers access inside iconic buildings across Pittsburgh's many culturally eclectic neighborhoods.

History 
DOORS OPEN Pittsburgh (DOP) was founded in 2016 by Pittsburgh resident Bonnie Baxter, after she had attended an event with a similar concept, Open House Chicago.  5,200 people attended the event in 2017. Equipped with stories of Pittsburgh’s rich history in arts and culture alongside its multiple industrial Renaissances, Ms. Baxter was guided by a greater vision of increasing the economic and social capital of Pittsburgh through experiential learning celebrating the City’s regional arts, architecture, and cultural heritage.

DOP’s first Annual Event (AE) in 2016 invited over 3,000 visitors into 39 historic, commercial, residential, and government buildings in Downtown Pittsburgh. With that event, Pittsburgh joined the ranks of more than 40 cities with “doors open/open house” events around the world, including New York, Toronto, and Paris. The AE continued as DOP’s single, signature event until early 2019, when bus tours were added. Since then, DOP has gone on to add a variety of tours and event concepts to its educational programming. The City of Pittsburgh was founded in 1758 and claims 90 distinct neighborhoods with many architectural treasures, both old and new, to explore.

Many of the DOORS OPEN Pittsburgh tours tell the stories of marginalized groups, including the LGBTQ community, the Jewish community, and the BIPOC community. Other events feature the quirky side of Pittsburgh: guides share stories of cemeteries, public art installations, and long-forgotten performance venues. Regardless of a person’s background, DOP welcomes all persons to learn, appreciate, and engage with multiple communities in the greater Pittsburgh area by creating immersive and approachable content.

, more than 16,000 tour goers have attended a DOORS OPEN Pittsburgh event.

References 

Hood, Mikey (1 October 2021) “Doors Open PGH Tours Allows Pittsburghers To Be Nebby” CBS Pittsburgh, Pittsburgh Live Today. Retrieved 21 October 2021.
Handler, Rick (28 September 2021) “DOORS OPEN Pittsburgh Returns for Sixth Year with New Buildings and Tours” Entertainment Central Pittsburgh.  Retrieved 21 October 2021.
Guggenheimer, Paul (25 June 2021) “New Homestead neighborhood tour offers 20 stops with unique access”  triblive.com  Retrieved 21 October 2021.
Krienke, Kimani (24 June 2021) “Doors Open tour Saturday will show off Homestead’s churches and revitalization”  Pittsburgh Post-Gazette.  Retrieved 21 October 2021.
KDKA-TV News Staff (11 May 2021) “Doors Open Pittsburgh Brings Back Guided Walking Tours Of City Neighborhoods”  KDKA-TV News. Retrieved 21 October 2021.
Tady, Scott (11 January 2021) “Virtually tour the Roberto Clemente Museum on Martin Luther King Jr. Day”  Beaver County Times.  Retrieved 21 October 2021.
Pompeani, Celina (29 September 2020) “Pittsburgh Today Live's Celina Pompeani chats with Doors Open founder Bonnie Baxter about what the event is all about!” Pittsburgh Live Today.  Retrieved 21 October 2021.
Nelson Jones, Diana (21 September 2020) “Doors Open Pittsburgh to offer peeks at EVEN Hotel, Terminal 21 and 20 other places” Pittsburgh Post-Gazette.  Retrieved 21 October 2021.
Friedberg, Nicole (18 February 2020) “You Can Explore Pittsburgh’s Underground Railroad with New Tour” Pittsburgh Magazine. Retrieved 21 October 2021.
Holden, Chris (31 January 2020) “Doors Open Pittsburgh expands to 13 themed tours in 2020” WESA-FM News. Retrieved 21 October 2021.
O'Toole, Bill (17 September 2018). "Doors Open event returns to Pittsburgh, giving you inside access to normally off-limits spaces". Next Pittsburgh. Retrieved 29 May 2019.
NSC Editor (6 October 2017). "The second annual Open Doors Pittsburgh to highlight 69 buildings throughout Downtown, Northside and the Strip District". Northside Chronicle. Retrieved 29 May 2019.
Sinichak, Jessica (25 September 2017). "Explore New and Historic Homes at Doors Open Pittsburgh". Pittsburgh Magazine. Retrieved 29 May 2019.
Jump up to:a b Sostek, Aya (11 September 2018). "Check out famous Pittsburgh buildings at Doors Open Pittsburgh". Pittsburgh Post-Gazette. Retrieved 29 May 2019.

External links 
 

Events in Pittsburgh
2016 establishments in Pennsylvania
Annual events in Pennsylvania